The former French Catholic diocese of Vence existed until the French Revolution. Its see was at Vence in Provence, in the modern department of Alpes Maritimes.

After the Concordat of 1801, the territory of the diocese passed to the diocese of Nice.

History
The first known Bishop of Vence is Severus, bishop in 439 and perhaps as early as 419. Among others are: St. Veranus, son of St. Eucherius, Archbishop of Lyons and a monk of Lérins, bishop before 451 and at least until 465; St. Lambert, first a Benedictine monk (died 1154); Alessandro Farnese (1505–1511).

Antoine Godeau, Bishop of Grasse, was named Bishop of Vence in 1638; the Holy See wished to unite the two dioceses. Meeting with opposition from the chapter and the clergy of Vence Godeau left Grasse in 1653, to remain Bishop of Vence, which see he held until 1672.

Bishops

See also
 Catholic Church in France
 List of Catholic dioceses in France
 Vence Cathedral

References

Bibliography

Reference Sources
 pp. 548–549. (Use with caution; obsolete)
  p. 301. (in Latin)
 p. 175.

 p. 219.

Studies

External links

Vence
1801 disestablishments in France